The Siku Quanshu, variously translated as the Complete Library in Four Sections, Imperial Collection of Four, Emperor's Four Treasuries, Complete Library in Four Branches of Literature or Complete Library of the Four Treasuries, was the largest collection of books in Chinese history with 36,381 volumes (册,Cè), 79,337 volumes (卷,Juǎn), 2.3 million pages and about 997 million words. The complete encyclopedia contains an annotated catalogue of 10,680 titles along with a compendiums of 3,593 titles. The Siku Quanshu ended up even longer than  the Ming dynasty's Yongle Encyclopedia of 1403, which had been China's largest encyclopedia until then. A complete copy of the Siku Quanshu are held with each of the following: the National Library of China in Beijing, the National Palace Museum in Taipei, the Gansu Library in Lanzhou, and the Zhejiang Library in Hangzhou.

History

Creation 
The Qianlong Emperor of the Qing dynasty ordered the creation of the Siku Quanshu in 1772. Local and provincial officers were put in charge of locating and collecting important books, and the emperor encouraged owners of rare or valuable books to send them to the capital. At first, few did, because of concerns about the Literary Inquisition, but towards the end of 1772 the emperor issued a decree stating that books would be returned to their owners once the compilation was finished and that the owners would not be punished if their books contained anti-Manchu sentiments. Less than three months after the issue of this decree, four to five thousand books were handed in.

By March 1773, an editorial board composed of hundreds of editors, collators, and copyists had been created in Beijing to gather and review books brought to them. This board included more than 361 scholars, with Ji Yun and Lu Xixiong (陸錫熊) as chief editors. Around 3,826 scribes copied every word by hand. They were not paid in cash, but each was given a government position after he had transcribed a set number of sections of the encyclopedia. It took more than ten years to complete the encyclopedia and all seven copies were distributed.

By 1782, the Siku Quanshu Zongmu Tiyao, a guide to the Siku Quanshu, had also been completed. It contains bibliographical information about the 3,593 titles in the Siku Quanshu and about 6,793 other books that were not included in it. The Siku Quanshu Zongmu Tiyao, which was published in 1793, became the largest Chinese book catalog of the time.

Compilation 

The initial compilation of the Siku Quanshu started with the Siku Quanshu Zongmu Tiyao and was completed in 1773. The first workable drafts were completed in 1781. These included bibliographical information on all the works included in the Siku Quanshu in full as well as a large number of works that are mentioned only by title.

As its title indicates, the Siku Quanshu contains four sections: Confucian Classics, which contains important works of Confucius; Belles-Lettres, which contains literary works ranging from personal letters to poems and writings meant for the masses; Historiography; and Masters. The contents of these latter two sections range from works on science and technology to writings on military affairs.

In the course of editing, a large number of corrections were made to local records. Personal documents, often describing the actions of noteworthy local people, were often included in the Siku Quanshu Zongmu Tiyao if their contents could be verified through central government records. In the Siku Quanshu itself, documents that could not be verified were often included by title only. Even officially sponsored writings, such as local gazetteers, were not safe from the scrutiny of the compilers.

Medical knowledge was often documented through case studies, on the model of twenty-five instances in Sima Qian's Records of the Grand Historian, which blended narrative with analysis. Similarly, works on philosophy took Huang Zongxi's writings as their model, though they came to be divided into two types: "archival", meaning scholarly articles, and "cultural", meaning Buddhist Kōans. Because authors and previous compilers had not considered philosophical works to form part of historical records, the compilers of the Siku Quanshu redefined the classifications in several compilations  and set boundaries based on authors' biographies and the purposes of their writings.

The Qianlong Emperor reviewed many of the works that were being compiled, and his opinions were conveyed through direct comments or imperial edicts. These colored the compilers' criteria for works suitable for inclusion in the Siku Quanshu, especially in relation to works expressing anti-Manchu sentiments. This can be exemplified in the compilers' handling of the story of Zhang Shicheng and his rival Zhu Yuanzhang. The Qianlong Emperor sought to discredit the Ming dynasty by highlighting the cruelty of its early rulers and contrasting it with the policies of his own Qing. The compilers did not see Zhang Shicheng's rule as legitimate, but as a natural response to the tyranny imposed on the people under the Ming dynasty.

Distribution 
The Qianlong Emperor commissioned seven copies of the Siku Quanshu. The first four copies were for the emperor himself and were kept in the north, in specially constructed libraries in the Forbidden City, Old Summer Palace, Shenyang, and Chengde. The remaining three copies were sent to the south, where they deposited in libraries in the cities of Hangzhou, Zhenjiang, and Yangzhou. All seven libraries also received copies of the imperial encyclopedia Gujin tushu jicheng, completed in 1725.

The copy kept in the Old Summer Palace was destroyed during the Second Opium War in 1860. The two copies kept in Zhenjang and Yangzhou were also completely destroyed, while the copy kept in Hangzhou was only about 70 to 80 percent destroyed during the Taiping Rebellion. The four remaining copies suffered some damage during the Second Sino-Japanese War. Today, those copies are located in the National Library of China in Beijing, the National Palace Museum in Taipei, the Gansu Provincial Library in Lanzhou, and the Zhejiang Library in Hangzhou.

Censorship
The Qianlong Emperor did not keep his promise to return books to their owners. Any books that did not make it into the Siku Quanshu risked becoming part of the Siku Jinshu, a catalogue of over 2,855 books that were rejected and banned during the completion of the Siku Quanshu. An additional four to five hundred books were also edited or censored. The majority of the books that were banned had been written towards the end of the Ming dynasty and contained anti-Manchu sentiments. The Siku Jinshu was the Qianlong Emperor's attempt to rid China of any remaining Ming Loyalists by executing scholars and burning any books that made direct or implicit political attacks on the Manchu.

Contents
Each copy of the Siku Quanshu was bound into 36,381 volumes (册,Cè), with more than 79,000 volumes (卷,Juǎn). In total, each copy is around 2.3 million pages, and has approximately 800 million Chinese characters.

Complete Catalogue  
The scholars working on the Siku Quanshu wrote a descriptive note for each book, detailing the author's name along with place and year of birth. Next, after they determined what parts of the author's work would go into the compilation, they analyzed the main points of the author's argument. This short annotation, which reflected their own opinions, was put at the beginning of the Siku Quanshu and formed the Complete Catalogue. The Complete Catalogue was divided into four sections or kù (庫, meaning "warehouse, storehouse, treasury, repository"), in reference to the divisions in the imperial library divisions. The title Siku Quanshu is a reference to these four sections: 
Jīng (經 "Classics") Chinese classic texts
Shǐ (史 "Histories") histories and geographies from Chinese history
Zĭ (子 "Masters") philosophy, arts, sciences from Chinese philosophy
Jí (集 "Collections") anthologies from Chinese literature

44 Sub-Categories 
The books are divided into 44 sub-categories or lèi. The Siku Quanshu includes most major Chinese texts, from the ancient Zhou Dynasty to the Qing Dynasty. It lacks any Western or Japanese texts. Included within the 44 sub-categories are the Analects of Confucius, Mencius, the Great Learning, the Doctrine of the Mean, the I Ching, the Rites of Zhou, the Classic of Rites, the Classic of Poetry, the Spring and Autumn Annals, the Shuowen Jiezi, the Records of the Grand Historian, the Zizhi Tongjian, The Art of War, the Guoyu, Stratagems of the Warring States, the Compendium of Materia Medica, and other classics.

See also
Four Great Books of Song
Literary inquisition
Siku Quanshu Zongmu Tiyao

References

Further reading
 http://taisingchan.mysinablog.com/index.php?op=ViewArticle&articleId=1648091 
 http://bbs.i56i.com/archiver/tid-50680.html 
 http://www.peopledaily.com.cn/GB/paper39/4099/481459.html

External links

Siku Quanshu scanned texts at Chinese Text Project (Chinese)
Siku Quanshu at World Digital Library
Ssu-k'u ch'uan-shu (Complete Library of the Four Treasuries) , National Palace Museum webpage
All That Is Worth to Know Under Heaven, Studiolum: the Library of the Humanist article
"China to Auction Grand Ancient Encyclopedia with Real Emperor's Seals". People's Daily Online. 26 October 2004.
"Destruction of Chinese Books in the Peking Siege of 1900" by Donald G. Davis, Jr. (of the University of Texas at Austin) and Cheng Huanwen (of Zhongshan University)
The Emperor's Four Treasures by R. Kent Guy
The Cambridge History of China by Peterson, Fairbank on literary inquisition p. 290
 历尽艰辛，终成瑰宝——《四库全书》大事年表 Timeline

1781 non-fiction books
18th-century encyclopedias
Chinese encyclopedias
Leishu
Qing dynasty literature